Group SNE is a Japanese company founded in 1986 by the current president Hitoshi Yasuda, which produces role-playing games, light novels, board games and card games. Ryo Mizuno was one of the founding members. Group SNE is named after Syntax Error, the programming language BASIC's term. The most famous product of Group SNE is Record of Lodoss War, which is well known for its fantasy anime adaptation. Moreover, there are several anime adaptations based upon Group SNE's products such as Legend of Crystania, Mon Colle Knights and Rune Soldier.

Group SNE's products are published by several publishers including Fujimi Shobo, Shinkigensha, JIVE, Enterbrain and Hobby Base.

Products
Group SNE's products include:

Forcelia campaign setting
Record of Lodoss War
Sword World RPG
Legend of Crystania
Rune Soldier
Sword World 2.0
Monster Collection
Rokumon Sekai RPG - RPG version of Monster Collection
Mon Colle Knights
GURPS Japanese products
GURPS Busin kourin - martial arts
GURPS Cocoon - comical fantasy
GURPS Damned Stalker (Gurps Youma Yakou/Hyakki Yasyou)
GURPS Dragon Merc - crossover of multi-planes
GURPS Power up
GURPS RebornRebirth
GURPS Runal/Yuel
Daikatsugeki - jidaigeki
DARK SOULS TRPG - TRPG version of From Software's Dark Souls 
Demon Parasite - superhero
Gehenna - Arabian fantasy
Ghosthunter RPG - horror, RPG version of Demon of Laplace
Hyper Tunnels & Trolls - original modified edition of Tunnels & Trolls
Laplace no Ma - computer RPGOuka Housin RPG - China-like fantasyShadowrun (Mega CD) - computer RPG version of ShadowrunSilver Rain RPG - based upon PBW RPGWizardry RPG - RPG version of WizardryShin Wizardy RPG - 2nd edition of Wizardry RPG
Translated gamesAdvanced Fighting FantasyDungeons & Dragons Rules CyclopediaEarthdawn 1st editionGURPS 3rd and 4th editionMechWarriorShadowrun 2nd editionStormbringer 2nd, Elric! and 5th editionTunnels & Trolls 5th and 7th editionWarhammer Fantasy Roleplay'' 1st edition

External links
Group SNE homepage 
SuperNaturalEngineering.com homepage 

Board game publishing companies
Role-playing game publishing companies
Japanese role-playing games
Publishing companies established in 1986
Japanese companies established in 1986